Thomas, Tom or Tommy Boyd may refer to:

Political figures
Thomas A. Boyd (1830–1897), U.S. Representative from Illinois
Thomas Boyd (Australian politician) (1802–1860), banker and member of the New South Wales Legislative Council in 1845
Thomas Boyd (Wisconsin politician) (1844–1915), Wisconsin State Assemblyman
Thomas Boyd Caldwell (1856–1932), Canadian politician
Tom Boyd (Northern Ireland politician) (1903–1991), Northern Irish political figure
Christopher Boyd (politician) (Thomas Christopher Boyd, 1916–2004), British politician
Tom Boyd (Idaho politician) (1928–2015), American farmer and politician
Thomas Boyd, 6th Lord Boyd (1547–1611), Scottish noble and politician

Sportspeople
Tom Boyd (gridiron football) (born 1959), American player of gridiron football
Tom Boyd (Scottish footballer) (born 1965), Scottish football player (Motherwell FC, Chelsea FC, Celtic FC, Scotland national team)
Tom Boyd (Australian footballer) (born 1995), Australian rules footballer
Tom Boyd (golfer) (1888–1952), Irish-American golfer

Other people
Lt. Thomas Boyd (died September, 1779)
Thomas Alexander Boyd (1898–1935), American novelist
Thomas Boyd, Earl of Arran (died c. 1473), Scottish nobleman
Thomas Duckett Boyd (1854–1932), American educator and president of Louisiana State University
Tommy Boyd (born 1952), British media personality
Thomas Jamieson Boyd (1818–1902), publisher and philanthropist
Sir Thomas Boyd, 14th-century Scottish landowner and lord of Kilmarnock in Ayrshire